Laurie Geltman (born in Baltimore and raised in Boston), is an American rock singer-songwriter-guitarist. She studied at the Berklee College of Music as a film score major, and began performing in the early 1990s with the experimental rock group Vasco da Gama. She was a Boston Music Awards winner in 1998 for Outstanding Female Vocalist. After that, she began her solo career. She released her first album, Departure, herself, then her second album, No Power Steering on her own label. A year after its release, No Power Steering was re-released by Eastern Front Records. She also released her third album Motion Pictures, on her own label. Her song "Ghost in the House" appeared on the Respond I compilation, a benefit CD for domestic violence groups, which includes also songs from Patty Larkin, Melissa Ferrick, Jenny Reynolds and Faith Soloway among others.

Discography
 Departure (self-released) (1992)
 No Power Steering (1997)
 Motion Pictures (recorded live at Club Passim) (1999)
 Up From Down (under band name LAYNE) (2006)
"Radio" (Single) Laurie Geltman (Released Feb. 17, 2023)

References

External links
 Official Web Site
 

Living people
American women singers
Berklee College of Music alumni
American folk musicians
Musicians from Baltimore
Musicians from Boston
American women songwriters
Songwriters from Massachusetts
Singers from Maryland
Year of birth missing (living people)
21st-century American women